The Flumps is a children's programme, created and written by Julie Holder, and produced for the BBC by David Yates. The show was broadcast by the BBC from 1977 to 1988.

Overview
The plot revolved around the various adventures of a family of furry characters called The Flumps. It was created and written by Julie Holder and narrated by Gay Soper. The theme tune was played by George Chisholm on the trombone.

In 1978, the BBC released a record, The Flumps (REC 309), that had 4 stories from the TV series narrated and sung by Gay Soper: "Keep Fit", "Balloons", "Moon Shot" and "Something Different".

In 2000, The Flumps was released on DVD. During early 2008, the theme tune was used in a series of adverts for Auto Trader magazine in the UK. These adverts were run again in Q3 2009.

Characters
The various flumps were:
Grandpa Flump, who played a Flumpet (a type of trumpet)
Father Flump, a keen gardener
Mother Flump, often seen cooking in the kitchen
Posey, a girl Flump
Perkin, a boy Flump
Pootle, the toddler Flump

Episode listing
 "Secrets"
 "The Cloud"
 "The Magnet"
 "Get Your Skates On"
 "Moon Shot"
 "Balloons"
 "Keep Fit"
 "Something Different"
 "Lend A Hand"
 "Quiet Please"
 "Grandfather's Birthday"
 "What A Carrot"
 "Where's Grandfather?"

Scheduling

The Flumps was shown 21 times between 1977 and 1988, usually around 1.45pm, and usually on BBC1. The transmission runs were as follows:

 14 February – 16 May 1977 (Mondays)
 5 October – 28 December 1977 (Wednesdays)
 2 April – 25 June 1978 (Sundays)
 2 October – 25 December 1978 (Mondays)
 3 April – 26 June 1979 (Tuesdays)
 4 October – 27 December 1979 (Thursdays)
 1 April – 24 June 1980 (Tuesdays)
 28 September – 21 December 1980 (Sundays)
 7 April – 30 June 1981 (Tuesdays)
 9 October 1981 – 1 January 1982 (Fridays)
 6 April – 29 June 1982 (Tuesdays)

 3 October – 26 December 1982 (Sundays)
 6 April – 29 June 1983 (Wednesdays)
 9 January – 26 March 1984 (Mondays)
 6 July – 28 September 1984 (Fridays)
 30 December 1984 – 24 March 1985 (Sundays)
 5 July – 27 September 1985 (Fridays)
 31 March – 23 June 1986 (Mondays)
 8 January – 2 April 1987 (Thursdays)
 8 July – 30 September 1987 (Wednesdays) on BBC2
 20 April – 13 July 1988 (Wednesdays) on BBC2

Footnotes

References

External links 
 
 
 
 

1977 British television series debuts
1977 British television series endings
1970s British children's television series
1970s British animated television series
Flumps, The
British children's animated musical television series
English-language television shows
Fictional species and races
British stop-motion animated television series